Hafezabad (also Romanized as Ḩāfez̧ābād) is a village in Gowhar Kuh Rural District, Nukabad District, Khash County, Sistan and Baluchestan Province, Iran. At the 2006 census, its population was 45, in 8 families.

References 

Populated places in Khash County